Thomas Olsen, better known by his stage name Tommy Trash, (born 15 November 1979) is an Australian DJ, record producer, and remixer. He currently resides in Los Angeles, California and signed to Ministry of Sound Australia.

Biography

Early life 
Thomas Olsen was born in Bundaberg, Queensland. He attended Walkervale State Primary School and Later Kepnock State high School. From an early age Thomas was proficient at Piano and Trumpet and was classically trained in both, he excelled at music in general and could play almost anything with a little practice.

Music career
The ARIA Music Awards of 2009 nomination of artist Tommy Trash, one of the EDM scene's biggest promises, is considered as one of the highlights of 2011.
Ever since he appeared on the scene in 2006, Tommy has been rocking the charts and the dance floors, and with over 50 productions (originals and remixes), and also he has quickly been recognised as one of Australia's biggest talents.

His peak era would begin in mid-2011, thanks to one of his most recognisable tunes, titled "The End". This has been one of his largest hits to date. This made him quickly noticed by high-profile DJs such as Tiësto, David Guetta, Swedish House Mafia, Afrojack, and Laidback Luke. "The End" pushed Tommy further into international fame.

Before "The End", he launched "All My Friends" in 2010, collaborating with Tom Piper and Mr. Wilson on the vocals, who has already lent his voice in Tommy's song, "Need Me To Stay", a song nominated by the ARIA Awards as a "Best Dance Record" in 2009. "All My Friends" managed to peak 6 weeks straight on the ARIA Club Charts. Due to its success, it was re-edited and remastered by Ministry of Sound on the United Kingdom and Germany, and peaked at 11 in the UK Cool Cuts chart.

Tommy also launched his music on worldwide labels, such as Spinnin, Refune, SIZE, Axtone, mau5trap, OWSLA, Boys Noize, Musical Freedom and Fool's Gold. He has collaborated with other producers such as A-Trak. Digitalism, Sebastian Ingrosso and Wolfgang Gartner, and he has made remixes for artists like Deadmau5, Empire of the Sun, Swedish House Mafia, Sub Focus, Zedd, Steve Aoki, plus many more.

In 2012, the 55th Annual Grammy Awards nominated Tommy for his remix of Deadmau5' song ""The Veldt"".

In compilations

The first Tommy Trash song that appeared on a mainstream compilation was "It's A Swede Thing" which was collaborated with Goodwill, this song was included on the downloadable edition of the Cream compilation "Cream Summer 2007". This gained Olsen some popularity and he went on to have his song "All My Friends" (with Tom Piper and Mr. Wilson) featured on the 2012 edition of the Ministry of Sound compilation known as The Annual, despite the name this edition of The Annual was actually released in 2011. This gave Olsen even more fame, and "All My Friends" was his most mainstream and successful single to date. "All My Friends" also received many remixes. The next song to feature on a mainstream album was "Future Folk", this was featured on another Cream compilation, this time it was "Cream Club Anthems 2012".

Most of Olsen's songs are featured on the "Musical Freedom" compilations. These are usually mixed by the likes of Dada Life, Steve Aoki, Tiesto, R3hab, Hard Rock Sofa and Swanky Tunes

Olsen has mixed a Ministry of Sound CD entitled "Inspired"; the CD was released on 17 March 2014 on Ministry of Sound/Data Records and Olsen's label, Ministry of Sound Australia.

Discography

Extended plays

Mix albums

Charted singles

Remixes
2006

 Sugiurumn – Star Baby (Goodwill & Tommy Trash Remix)

2007

 Craig Obey - Music in My Mind
 Tommy Trash - Slide (Tommy Trash Electro Cut)
 Green Velvet (feat. Walter Phillips) – Shake & Pop
 Goodwill & Tommy Trash - It's a Swede Thing
 Delta Goodrem – Believe Again
 The Veronicas – Hook Me Up
 Benjamin Bates – Two Flies
 Tom Novy – Unexpected
 Betty Vale - Jump On Board
 Arno Cost & Arias – Magenta (Goodwill & Tommy Trash Exclusive Remix)
 Anton Neumark – Need You Tonight (Goodwill & Tommy Trash Remix)
 Grafton Primary – Relativity
 Armand Van Helden – I Want Your Soul
 My Ninja Lover – 2 x 2 (My Ninja Lover vs. Tommy Trash Edit)

2008

 The Camel Rider & Mark Alston (feat. Mark Shine) – Addicted
 Faithless – Insomnia 2008 (Tommy Trash Electro Mix)
 Karton – Never Too Late (Tommy Trash & fRew's "fRew.T.Trash" Mix)
 Mason – The Ridge
 Dabruck & Klein – Cars
 Soul Central (feat. Abigail Bailey) – Time After Time
 Meck (feat. Dino) – So Strong
 House of Pain vs. Mickey Slim - Jump Around (Tommy Trash Edit)
 Kaskade – Step One Two

2009

 Chili Hi Fly (feat. Jonas) – I Go Crazy
 FRew & Chris Arnott (feat. Rosie Henshaw) – My Heart Stops (Tommy Trash Remix/Dub)
 Orgasmic & Tekitek – The Sixpack Anthem
 Neon Stereo – Feel This Real
 Lady Sovereign – I Got You Dancing

2010

 Hiroki Esashika – Kazane
 Dave Winnel – Festival City
 Bass Kleph – Duro
 Stafford Brothers (feat. Seany B) – Speaker Freakers
 DBN – Chicago
 Idriss Chebak – Warm & Oriental
 DBN & Tommy Trash (feat. Michael Feiner) - Stars
 Anané – Plastic People
 Pocket 808 (feat. Phil Jamieson) – Monster (Babe)
 Dimitri Vegas & Like Mike (feat. VanGosh) – Deeper Love
 Jacob Plant (feat. JLD) – Basslines In (Tommy Trash Remix/Dub)
 The Potbelleez – Shake It
 Tommy Trash & Tom Piper (feat. Mr Wilson) - All My Friends (Piper & Trash Remix)

2011

 fRew & Chris Arnott (feat. Rosie) – This New Style
 Ou Est le Swimming Pool - The Key
 The Immigrant – Summer Of Love (She Said)
 Tommy Trash - The End (Tommy Rework)
 Gypsy & The Cat – Jona Vark
 Grant Smillie (feat. Zoë Badwi) – Carry Me Home
 BKCA (aka Bass Kleph & Chris Arnott) – We Feel Love
 Richard Dinsdale, Sam Obernik & Hook N Sling – Edge Of The Earth
 John Dahlbäck (feat. Erik Hassle) – One Last Ride
 EDX (feat. Sarah McLeod) – Falling Out Of Love
 Dirty South & Thomas Gold (feat. Kate Elsworth) – Alive
 Moby – After
 Zedd – Shave It
 Steve Forte Rio (feat. Lindsey Ray) – Slumber
 R3hab & Swanky Tunes (feat. Max C) – Sending My Love
 Timbaland (feat. Pitbull) – Pass at Me
 Pnau - Unite Us

2012

 Swedish House Mafia vs. Knife Party – Antidote
 Steve Aoki (feat. Wynter Gordon) – Ladi Dadi
 Chris Lake – Build Up (Tommy Trash Edit)
 Nicky Romero – Toulouse 
 fRew (feat. John Dubbs & Honorebel) – Wicked Woman
 Moguai & Tommy Trash – In N' Out (Tommy Trash Club Mix)
 Deadmau5 (feat. Chris James) – The Veldt
 Cubic Zirconia – Darko

2013

 Sub Focus (feat. Alex Clare) – Endorphins
 Tommy Trash - Monkey See Monkey Do (Tommy Trash Re-Edit)
 Destructo – Higher
 Empire of the Sun – Celebrate

2015

 Caribou – Can't Do Without You
 Tiga (feat. Pusha T) – Bugatti

2016

 Dillon Francis & Kygo (feat. James Hersey) - Coming Over
 Ookay - Thief
 Empire of the Sun - High and Low

2017

 GRiZ (feat. Cory Enemy & Natalola) - What We've Become

2020

 Deadmau5 and Keisza - Bridged by a Lightwave

Writing and production credits

Notes
 signifies a vocal producer.

References

External links 
 Tommy Trash on Beatport
 Tommy Trash on Discogs

1979 births
Living people
Australian DJs
Musicians from Queensland
Mau5trap artists
People from Bundaberg
Australian house musicians
Australian electronic musicians
Electronic dance music DJs